Peter C. Oppenheimer is chief global equity strategist and head of Macro Research in Europe within Global Investment Research at Goldman Sachs. Oppenheimer joined Goldman Sachs in 2002 as European and global strategist and was named managing director in 2003 and partner in 2006. He regularly appears in news outlets such as Financial Times, CNBC, The Guardian, The Independent, Bloomberg, and Barron’s among others as a finance strategist and expert.

Prior to joining the firm, Oppenheimer worked as managing director and chief investment strategist at HSBC and was previously head of European strategy at James Capel. Prior to that, he was chief economic strategist at Hambros Bank. Oppenheimer began his career as an economist at Greenwells in 1985.

In 2020, Oppenheimer wrote the book The Long Good Buy: Analysing Cycles in Markets¸ which explores the differences between cyclical factors and secular trends in markets, and the specific factors that have emerged for investors since the financial crisis.

Background 
Oppenheimer grew up in London where he attended Hendon School. He earned a BSc, first class, in Geography from the London School of Economics. He is a trustee of The Anna Freud National Centre for Children and Families and he used to be a trustee of the Anne Frank Trust UK. He is also a trustee of Mitzvah Day.

Op-eds and publications 
Binder, Jessica; Nielsen, Anders Ersbak Bang; and Oppenheimer, Peter (2010). “Finding Fair Value in Global Equities: Part I.” 36(2), The Journal of Portfolio Management, 80 – 93.
Daly, Kevin; Nielsen, Anders Ersbak Bang; and Oppenheimer, Peter (2010). “Finding Fair Value in Global Equities: Part II—Forecasting Returns.” 36(3), The Journal of Portfolio Management, 56 – 70.
Nielsen, Anders Ersbak Bang; and Oppenheimer, Peter (2011). Valuation over the cycle and the distribution of returns. In In F. Fabozzi and H. Markowitz (Ed.), Equity Valuation and Portfolio Management. Hoboken, New Jersey: John Wiley & Sons, Inc.
Oppenheimer, Peter (2017). “Importance of Timing Bear Market is Overstated,” Financial Times.
Oppenheimer, Peter (2012). “There is Life in This 'Investable' Rally,” Financial Times.

References 

American business executives
Living people
Year of birth missing (living people)
Goldman Sachs people